Stanley John McKay (born 1942), known as Stan McKay, is a Canadian Protestant minister from Fisher River Cree Nation, Manitoba. He served as the 34th Moderator of the United Church of Canada and is the first Indigenous person to have led a mainline Protestant denomination in Canada.

References 

 
 
 

Cree people
Moderators of the United Church of Canada
People from Interlake Region, Manitoba
University of Winnipeg alumni
Living people
Ministers of the United Church of Canada
Indspire Awards
1942 births